Femap (Finite Element Modeling And Postprocessing) is an engineering analysis program sold by Siemens Digital Industries Software that is used to build finite element models of complex engineering problems ("pre-processing") and view solution results ("post-processing").  It runs on Microsoft Windows and provides CAD import, modeling and meshing tools to create a finite element model, as well as postprocessing functionality that allows mechanical engineers to interpret analysis results.  The finite element method allows engineers to virtually model components, assemblies, or systems to determine behavior under a given set of boundary conditions, and is typically used in the design process to reduce costly prototyping and testing, evaluate differing designs and materials, and for structural optimization to reduce weight.

Product simulation applications include basic strength analysis, frequency and transient dynamic simulation, system-level performance evaluation and advanced response, fluid flow and multi-physics engineering analysis for simulation of functional performance.

Femap is used by engineering organizations and consultants to model complex products, systems and processes including satellites, aircraft, defense electronics, heavy construction equipment, lift cranes, marine vessels and process equipment.

History 

1985 - ESP founded by George Rudy and Femap originally developed as a pre- and postprocessor to Nastran.
1999 - ESP acquired by SDRC
2001 - SDRC acquired by EDS
2004 - Product Lifecycle Management (PLM) software suite spun off to form UGS
2007 - UGS acquired by the Automation & Drives Division of Siemens and Siemens Digital Industries Software formed
 
Femap product development continues as a CAD neutral and solver independent application. Also it is available bundled with a number of Siemens PLM solvers, including NX Nastran, Advanced Non-Linear Solver, Thermal/Advanced Thermal Solver, and Flow Solver.
As a standalone utility Femap is typically used with independent solvers such as ADINA, NEi Nastran, LS-DYNA, ANSYS or Abaqus.

Application 

Femap is used in a number of industries, including aerospace  and marine.

Add-ons
SDC Verifier enhances Femap with a new functionality. Together they provide an accepted and sound solution for the verification of constructions according to Structural Design Standards. SDC Verifier uses Femap as the pre-processor for the generation of a model and its graphical interface to visualize the results.

• Blog of FEMAP & NX Nastran: written and maintained by Blas Molero Hidalgo from IBERISA (Spain) with videos, examples and much information about Finite Element Analysis (FEM/FEA) to support the FEMAP community all around the world.

References

Finite element software
Product lifecycle management
Siemens software products
Windows-only software